This is the discography of American rock band the Lovin' Spoonful.

Albums

Studio albums

Live albums

Soundtrack albums

Compilation albums

EPs

Singles

Notes

References

Discographies of American artists
Rock music group discographies
Folk music discographies